The VMI Keydets basketball program competes in the Southern Conference of the National Collegiate Athletic Association's Division I, representing the Virginia Military Institute in Lexington, Virginia. The program has had 26 head coaches since its inception in 1908–09.

The school's first team was led by Pete Krebs, who guided the Keydets to a 3–3 record in his only season as head coach. After 16 years playing as an independent, VMI joined the Southern Conference in 1924, where they would play for nearly eighty years until joining the Big South Conference in 2003. VMI has had only three NCAA tournament appearances in hits history, the first of which came in 1964 under L. F. "Weenie" Miller. VMI was eliminated in the first round with an 86–60 loss to Princeton.

VMI's most successful run occurred in the late 1970s where Bill Blair led the Keydets to wins over Tennessee and DePaul after a 22–10 campaign in 1975–76. The Keydets finally fell to Rutgers in the Elite 8, 91–75. After Blair departed for Colorado, Charlie Schmaus took over and, with a roster of VMI Hall of Famer Ron Carter alongside Will Bynum, Dave Montgomery, and John Krovic, guided VMI to its best season in school history with a 26–4 record and their third NCAA tournament appearance, where they defeated Duquesne 73–66, and lost to Kentucky in the following round by a score of 93–78. At the season's end, VMI was ranked #20 in the AP Poll, the school's first and only final AP ranking to this date.

Duggar Baucom, who led the Keydets from 2005 to 2015, is the school's all-time leader in wins with 151 total victories, and also holds the program record for conference wins with 73.

VMI's current head coach is Dan Earl, who was hired prior to the 2015–16 season.

Key

Coaches
Statistics correct as of the end of the 2017–18 NCAA Division I men's basketball season

References
General
2017–18 VMI Basketball Fact Book
Specific

VMI

VMI Keydets basketball coaches